The following is a list of radio stations owned by GMA Network Inc., through its subsidiary RGMA Network, Inc.

Super Radyo

Barangay FM

Notes

References